Girls is an American comedy-drama television series created by and starring Lena Dunham, executive-produced by Judd Apatow. The series depicts four young women living in New York City. The show's premise was drawn from Dunham's own life, as were major aspects of the main character, including financial isolation from her parents, becoming a writer, and making unfortunate decisions.

The first season of Girls was filmed between April and August 2011. The first three episodes were screened at the 2012 SXSW Festival and the series premiered on HBO on April 15, 2012. The second season ran on HBO from January 13, 2013, to March 17, 2013. The third season, which contained 12 episodes (the previous seasons had 10 episodes) ran from January 12, 2014, to March 23, 2014. The fourth season of the series started filming in April 2014 and premiered on January 11, 2015. The fifth season premiered on February 21, 2016. Girls sixth and final season concluded on April 16, 2017. There were a total of 62 episodes.

The show has received critical praise and awards, including the Golden Globe Award for Best Television Series – Musical or Comedy and the British Academy Television Award for Best International Programme.

Synopsis 
Two years after graduating from Oberlin College, aspiring writer Hannah Horvath is shocked when her parents announce they will no longer financially support her life in Brooklyn, New York. Left to her own devices in, Hannah navigates her twenties "one mistake at a time." Allison Williams, Jemima Kirke, Zosia Mamet, Adam Driver, Alex Karpovsky, and Andrew Rannells co-star as Hannah's circle of friends.

Cast and characters

Main cast 

 Lena Dunham as Hannah Helene Horvath: an aspiring writer living in Greenpoint, Brooklyn, originally from East Lansing, Michigan, known for her spunk and bad decisions, who struggles to support herself and find a direction in her life. In season two, she struggles with a relapse of the OCD symptoms she suffered from in her youth. In the final season, she becomes pregnant after a brief fling, and later leaves New York City to take a teaching job upstate and raise her baby.
 Allison Williams as Marnie Marie Michaels: Hannah's best friend and, at the start of season 1, roommate. Along with Jessa, Charlie and Elijah, Marnie was a classmate of Hannah's at Oberlin College. She worked as an art gallery assistant, but is later fired in Season 2 and is left to pursue her dream: a career in music. Domineering and arguably as self-centred and narcissistic as Hannah, Marnie struggles in her relationships with Charlie and Ray for much of the series, and eventually ends up marrying her musical partner, Desi Harperin. When both her career and her marriage collapse, she eventually moves upstate with Hannah to help raise her baby.
 Jemima Kirke as Jessa Johansson: One of Hannah's closest friends, Jessa is a global citizen of British origin, and is known for being bohemian, unpredictable, and brash. At the start of the series, Jessa has recently returned to New York from a stint abroad, and becomes roommates with her cousin, Shoshanna, in Nolita, Manhattan. Jessa navigates many life struggles and poor choices, including a short-lived marriage and a stint in rehab due to heroin and cocaine addiction. When she pursues a relationship with Hannah's ex-boyfriend, Adam, she and Hannah have an explosive falling out. In the final season, she struggles with the realization that her life is in tatters, and is abandoned by Shosh. Ultimately, she manages to make her peace with Hannah before she leaves New York.
 Zosia Mamet as Shoshanna Shapiro: Jessa's naive and innocent American cousin who's a Media, Culture, and Communications major at New York University. She is a fan of the TV series Sex and the City and is embarrassed to still be a virgin at the start of the series. The character is fast talking and her lack of enunciation gives her a mumbling, nervous persona. As the series progresses, Shoshanna graduates and struggles to find a career path that suits her. After a brief career stint in Japan, she comes to realize that her friendship with the other three has only ever held her back, and ultimately distances herself from them.
 Adam Driver as Adam Sackler: an aloof, passionate young man, Adam works as a part-time carpenter and actor. At the start of the series, he is in a casual relationship with Hannah, which becomes serious before ultimately falling apart as he gains success as an actor. He later enters a volatile relationship with Jessa, which is implied to be ongoing as the series ends. Adam is an alcoholic who has been sober for years. Pulitzer Prize-winning art critic Jerry Saltz has endorsed the idea that Adam is intended to be a fictional scion of the real-life Sackler family, and that Adam’s substance abuse and art world adjacency are intended as commentary on the real-life family's controversial relationship with the opioid crisis and arts philanthropy. Dunham has not commented on whether the character’s naming was intentional.
 Alex Karpovsky as Raymond "Ray" Ploshansky: Originally Charlie's friend, but later a friend of the others, and the group's straight man. Eventually, he has sexual and romantic relationships with both Shoshanna and Marnie. At the start of season 3, he is made manager of a spin-off of Grumpy's, called Ray's.
 Andrew Rannells as Elijah Krantz: Hannah's ex-boyfriend from college, who reveals that he is gay. Despite some initial hostility between the pair, they eventually become friends and later roommates on and off. The two grow much closer as roommates.
 Ebon Moss-Bachrach as Desi Harperin: Adam's co-star in Major Barbara and Marnie's bandmate. Despite having a girlfriend, Clementine, he and Marnie engage in a sexual relationship that he keeps secret, to Marnie's chagrin. Clementine eventually breaks up with him. He and Marnie have a public relationship. They become engaged, and later marry. Marnie eventually ends the relationship with him when she tires of his childishness and self-indulgence. In season 6, it is revealed that Desi is addicted to prescription pain killers after Marnie cheats on Ray with him. 
 Jake Lacy as Fran Parker, a colleague of Hannah's whom she dates. In season 5, Fran moves in with Hannah and Elijah, but he and Hannah break up by the end of the season.

Recurring cast 

 Becky Ann Baker and Peter Scolari as Loreen and Tad Horvath (season 1–6): Hannah's parents. They are both college professors at Michigan State University, and they live in East Lansing, Michigan. Loreen and Tad cut off Hannah's financial support in the pilot episode so that Hannah will become independent and focus on her writing. Hannah then visits them for their 30th anniversary, but does not share her recent financial troubles. In the fourth season, the marriage breaks down when Tad comes out as gay, and after a year of struggling on his own, Tad moves to New York to pursue a relationship with his new boyfriend (Ethan Phillips), while Loreen adjusts to life on her own, starts consuming cannabis and eventually fills the role of grandmother to Hannah's baby. (Baker, 20 episodes; Scolari, 21 episodes)
 Christopher Abbott as Charlie Dattolo (season 1–2, 5): Marnie's ex-boyfriend, with whom she became increasingly bored. For a while they contemplate their relationship and try to make it work, but eventually this erodes and Charlie leaves the series. Upon Charlie's abrupt return in season 5, he and Marnie briefly decide to run away together until Marnie realizes Charlie isn't the person he used to be. (13 episodes)
 Kathryn Hahn and James LeGros as Katherine and Jeff Lavoyt (season 1): The parents of two young girls that Jessa babysat. Katherine is a documentary filmmaker, and Jeff is unemployed. Jeff develops a romantic interest in Jessa, which she eventually stops. She is fired, but is later visited by Katherine who offers her job back. Despite deciding not to see each other again, they have a heart-to-heart over Jeff and Jessa's inability to grow up. (4 episodes each)
 Chris O'Dowd as Thomas-John (season 1–2): An affluent venture capitalist. After an earlier unpleasant encounter with Jessa and Marnie, he ends up marrying Jessa in a surprise ceremony at the end of the first season. They break up after an unpleasant dinner with his parents. (5 episodes)
 Jon Glaser as Laird Schlesinger (season 2–6): Hannah's neighbor and a recovering drug addict. (12 episodes)
 Colin Quinn as Hermie (season 2–6): Ray's boss at the coffee shop. He dies in "Painful Evacuation" from scleroderma. (8 episodes)
 John Cameron Mitchell as David Pressler-Goings (season 2–3): Hannah's editor for her e-book. He is either bisexual or gay, as he downloaded the application Grindr in the episode "She Said OK". He is found dead in the episode "Dead Inside" with his funeral taking place at "Only Child" where it is revealed he had a wife named Annalise. (5 episodes)
 Shiri Appleby as Natalia (season 2–3): Adam's ex-girlfriend. He abruptly breaks up with her after getting back together with Hannah. (4 episodes)
 Gaby Hoffmann as Caroline Sackler (season 3–6): Adam's extremely troubled sister. She is very sarcastic towards Adam and Hannah until the latter kicks her out. She then lived with Laird, became pregnant by him and gave birth to their daughter before going AWOL in the fifth season. (8 episodes)
 Richard E. Grant as Jasper (season 3): Jessa's friend from rehab. He comes to New York to find Jessa but later leaves her to be with his estranged daughter Dot. (4 episodes)
 Gillian Jacobs as Mimi-Rose Howard (season 4), Adam's new girlfriend after Hannah moves away to Iowa. (5 episodes)
 Aidy Bryant as Abigail (season 4–6): Shoshanna's former boss from when she worked in Japan. She later appears again meeting Shoshanna and Ray by chance and works with Ray to continue Hermie's project of documenting the effects of gentrification. Ray and Abigail get on well together leading to them sharing a kiss. (4 episodes)
 Corey Stoll as Dill Harcourt (season 5–6): Elijah's love interest. (5 episodes)

Production 
Lena Dunham's 2010 second feature, Tiny Furniture—which she wrote, directed and starred in—received positive reviews at festivals as well as awards attention, including Best Narrative Feature at South by Southwest and Best First Screenplay at the 2010 Independent Spirit Awards. The independent film's success earned her the opportunity to collaborate with Judd Apatow for an HBO pilot. Judd Apatow said he was drawn to Dunham's imagination after watching Tiny Furniture, and added that Girls would provide men with an insight into "realistic females."

Some of the struggles facing Dunham's character Hannah—including being cut off financially from her parents, becoming a writer and making unfortunate decisions—are inspired by Dunham's real-life experiences. The show's look is achieved by furnishings at a number of vintage boutiques in New York, including Brooklyn Flea and Geminola owned by Jemima Kirke's mother.

Dunham said Girls reflects a part of the population not portrayed in the 1998 HBO series Sex and the City. "Gossip Girl was teens duking it out on the Upper East Side and Sex and the City was women who [had] figured out work and friends and now want to nail romance and family life. There was this 'hole-in-between' space that hadn't really been addressed," she said. The pilot intentionally references Sex and the City as producers wanted to make it clear that the driving force behind Girls is that the characters were inspired by the former HBO series and moved to New York to pursue their dreams. Dunham herself says she "revere[s] that show just as much as any girl of her generation".

As executive producer, Dunham and Jennifer Konner are both showrunners of the series while Dunham is also the head writer. Apatow is also executive producer, under his Apatow Productions label. Dunham wrote or co-wrote all ten episodes of the first season and directed five, including the pilot. Season one was filmed between April and August 2011 and consisted of 10 episodes. The second season ran on HBO from January 13, 2013, to March 17, 2013, and also consisted of 10 episodes.

On April 4, 2013, Christopher Abbott left the series after sources reported he and Dunham had differences with the direction that his reoccurring character Charlie was taking as the third season entered production. Dunham announced via Instagram on September 6, 2013, that production for the third season had concluded. Season 3, which contained 12 episodes as opposed to the previous 10-episode seasons, ran from January 12, 2014, to March 23, 2014. The fourth season of the series started filming in April 2014. On January 5, 2016, HBO announced that the series' sixth season would be its last, allowing the writers to create a proper finale.

Episodes

Reception

Critical response

Season 1 
The first season of Girls received universal acclaim from television critics. On review aggregation website Metacritic, the first season of the series holds an average of 87 based on 29 reviews. The website also lists the show as the highest-rated fictional series debut of 2012.

James Poniewozik from Time reserved high praise for the series, calling it "raw, audacious, nuanced and richly, often excruciatingly funny". Tim Goodman of The Hollywood Reporter called Girls "one of the most original, spot-on, no-missed-steps series in recent memory". Reviewing the first three episodes at the 2012 SXSW Festival, he said the series conveys "real female friendships, the angst of emerging adulthood, nuanced relationships, sexuality, self-esteem, body image, intimacy in a tech-savvy world that promotes distance, the bloodlust of surviving New York on very little money and the modern parenting of entitled children, among many other things—all laced together with humor and poignancy". The New York Times also applauded the series and said: "Girls may be the millennial generation's rebuttal to Sex and the City, but the first season was at times as cruelly insightful and bleakly funny as Louie on FX or Curb Your Enthusiasm on HBO."

Despite many positive reviews, several critics criticized the characters themselves. Gawker's John Cook strongly criticised Girls, saying it was "a television program about the children of wealthy famous people and shitty music and Facebook and how hard it is to know who you are and Thought Catalog and sexually transmitted diseases and the exhaustion of ceaselessly dramatizing your own life while posing as someone who understands the fundamental emptiness and narcissism of that very self-dramatization."

Season 2 
The second season of Girls continued to receive critical acclaim. On Metacritic, the second season of the series holds an average of 84 based on 19 reviews. 
Tim Goodman of The Hollywood Reporter stated that "Girls kicks off its second season even more assured of itself, able to deftly work strands of hard-earned drama into the free-flowing comedic moments of four postcollege girls trying to find their way in life". David Wiegland of the San Francisco Chronicle said that "The entire constellation of impetuous, ambitious, determined and insecure young urbanites in Girls is realigning in the new season, but at no point in the four episodes sent to critics for review do you feel that any of it is artificial". Verne Gay of Newsday said it is "Sharper, smarter, more richly layered, detailed and acted". Ken Tucker of Entertainment Weekly felt that "As bright-eyed and bushy-tailed as it was in its first season, Girls may now be even spunkier, funnier, and riskier". In reference to the series' growth, Willa Paskin of Salon thought that Girls "has matured by leaps and bounds, comedically and structurally, but it has jettisoned some of its ambiguity, its sweetness, its own affection for its characters. It's more coherent, but it's also safer."

Season 3 
The third season of Girls received generally positive reviews. On Metacritic, the third season of the series holds an average of 76 based on 18 reviews. Rotten Tomatoes reports an 89% "Certified Fresh" approval rating from critics, based on 27 reviews with an average score of 7.8/10. The consensus states: "Still rife with shock value, Season 3 of Girls also benefits from an increasingly mature tone."

Tim Goodman of The Hollywood Reporter lauded the first two episodes, and commented: "Going into its third season, Girls is as refreshing and audacious as ever and one of the few half-hour dramedies where you can feel its heart pounding and see its belly ripple with laughter." In addition, The New York Times, Entertainment Weekly and PopMatters praised the comedic portrayal of its lead female characters.

Season 4 
The fourth season of Girls received generally positive reviews. On Metacritic, the fourth season of the series holds an average of 75 based on 16 reviews. Rotten Tomatoes reports an 83% "Certified Fresh" approval rating from critics, based on 24 reviews with an average score of 7.5/10. The consensus states: "Girls is familiar after four seasons, but its convoluted-yet-comical depiction of young women dealing with the real world still manages to impress."

Season 5 
The fifth season of Girls received generally positive reviews. On Metacritic, the fifth season of the series holds an average of 73 based on 13 reviews. Rotten Tomatoes reports an 85% "Certified Fresh" approval rating from critics, based on 20 reviews with an average score of 8.14/10. The consensus states: "Though some characters have devolved into caricatures, watching them struggle in Girls is more fun in season five, with sharper humor and narrative consistency than prior seasons." 
Daniel Fienberg of The Hollywood Reporter gave the season a positive review writing: "Girls had only a niche audience. It's possible that being freed from the responsibility of the zeitgeist is what has kept Girls so watchable. The start of the fifth season won't launch an armada of think pieces, but if you still get pleasure from watching these flawed, often awful characters make flawed, often funny choices, Girls is still Girls."

Season 6 
The sixth season of Girls received highly positive reviews from critics. On Metacritic, the sixth season of the series holds an average of 79 based on 15 reviews. Rotten Tomatoes reports an 89% approval rating from critics, based on 35 reviews with an average score of 8.01/10. The consensus states, "In its final season, Girls remains uncompromising, intelligent, character driven, compassionate – and at times consciously aggravating."

The broadcast of the season's third episode "American Bitch" in Australia on showcase had to be edited, due to a scene which breached the maximum MA15+ classification of the broadcaster.

Accolades

Racial controversy 
The premiere of the pilot was also met with criticism regarding the all-white main cast in the otherwise culturally diverse setting of New York City (the only black actors in the pilot were a homeless man and a taxi driver, and the only Asian actress had the sole trait of being good at Photoshop).

Writing at The Hairpin, Jenna Wortham rebuked the show for its lack of a main black character. "It feels alienating, a party of four engineered to appeal to a very specific subset of the television viewing audience, when the show has the potential to be so much bigger than that. And that is a huge fucking disappointment."

Lesley Arfin, a writer for the show, responded to the controversy with the tweeted comment: "What really bothered me most about Precious was that there was no representation of ME". Arfin later deleted the comment following the uproar. Lena Dunham has given interviews where she talks about the diversity question with the series, stating that with HBO's renewal of the series for a second season, "these issues will be addressed". Donald Glover guest starred as Sandy, a black Republican and Hannah's love interest, in the first two episodes of season two.

Agreeing that there is a lack of racial diversity on Girls, Maureen Ryan from The Huffington Post argues that the issue is the industry as a whole. "Where are the think pieces taking networks to task for the millionth procedural about a troubled male cop or the millionth comedy about a guy who has problems with women? Why are we holding Lena Dunham's feet to the fire, instead of the heads of networks and studios? That troubles me, not least because it's easier (and lazier) to attack a 25-year-old woman who's just starting out than to attack the men twice her age who actually control the industry. ...I have to say that I'm absolutely astonished that, of all shows, this is the one that is being attacked for being too white. I could list the shows on television with all-white casts, but then we'd be here all day." Dunham has publicly said, "I really wrote the show from a gut-level place, and each character was a piece of me or based on someone close to me". She adds that she wanted to avoid tokenism in casting. The experience of a black character would involve a certain specificity, a type she could not speak to.

Feminism 
Girls has prompted debate about its treatment of feminism. It has been praised for its portrayal of women and female friendship but criticized as classist, racist, transphobic and misguided. In an online review for Ms Magazine, Kerensa Cadenas argues, "Despite its lack of a serious class and race consciousness, Girls does address other feminist issues currently in play, among them body image, abortion, relationships within a social media age, and street harassment. In another series, these issues might be the focus of one episode (e.g., the abortion episode of SATC), but in Girls they become everyday topics."

On the other hand, Catherine Scott of The Independent, writing about season one in 2012, asked, "What's there to celebrate for feminism when black, Hispanic or Asian women are totally written out of a series that's supposedly set in one of the most diverse cities on earth? But also, what's there to celebrate for feminism when a show depicts four entirely self-interested young women and a lead character having the most depressing, disempowered sexual relationships imaginable?"

Broadcast 
Girls premiered on April 15, 2012, on HBO in the United States. The first three episodes were screened at the 2012 SXSW Festival on March 12.

HBO renewed the series for a second season of ten episodes on April 30, 2012.

On January 7, 2014, the premiere of the third season of Girls was shown at the Rose Theater at Lincoln Center in New York City. Models Karlie Kloss, Karen Elson, and Hilary Rhoda; designers Nicole Miller, Cynthia Rowley, and Zac Posen; and editors Anna Wintour, Joanna Coles, and Amy Astley were all in attendance. The after party was at the Allen Room and "hosted by HBO and the Cinema Society".

International 
Girls premiered on OSN in the Middle East on September 7, 2012. In Australia, it premiered on Showcase on May 28, 2012. The series began airing on HBO Canada on April 15, 2012. In New Zealand, the SoHo channel premiered Girls in May 2012.

In the United Kingdom and Ireland, the series premiered on Sky Atlantic on October 22, 2012. The second season premiered on January 14, 2013, and the third season began airing on January 20, 2014. The fourth season premiered on January 12, 2015.

Home media

References

External links 
 

2012 American television series debuts
2017 American television series endings
2010s American comedy-drama television series
2010s American LGBT-related comedy television series
2010s American LGBT-related drama television series
BAFTA winners (television series)
Best Musical or Comedy Series Golden Globe winners
English-language television shows
HBO original programming
Obsessive–compulsive disorder in fiction
Peabody Award-winning television programs
Television controversies in the United States
Television series about cousins
Television series by Apatow Productions
Television series by Home Box Office
Television series created by Judd Apatow
Television shows filmed in New York (state)
Television shows set in Brooklyn
Television shows set in Manhattan